Challu (also Romanized as Chāllū; also known as Chāleh, Chālī, and Chārlī) is a village in Mehraban-e Olya Rural District, Shirin Su District, Kabudarahang County, Hamadan Province, Iran. At the 2006 census, its population was 1,173, in 284 families.

References 

Populated places in Kabudarahang County